Maria da Gloria Carvalho is a Brazilian beauty queen who is the only delegate from Brazil who has won the Miss International title.

She placed second runner-up in the Miss Brasil pageant, as the representative of Guanabara, in 1968, hence, earning the ticket for Maria to compete in the Miss International pageant in the latter part of the year, when it was held for the first time in Tokyo, Japan. Her knowledge of the Japanese language helped her win over the crowd and judges.

Her victory came in the same year that Martha Vasconcellos, winner of the Miss Brasil pageant, won the Miss Universe title.

References

Miss International winners
Year of birth missing (living people)
Living people
Miss International 1968 delegates
Brazilian beauty pageant winners